Liberation is a  reggae album by Bunny Wailer, released in 1989 (see 1989 in music) under the Gallo record label.  Wailer was one third of The Wailers, with Peter Tosh and Bob Marley.  Liberation was widely praised and considered a landmark album.

Track listing
All tracks written by Neville "Bunny" Livingston.
"Rise and Shine"
"Liberation"
"Botha the Mosquito"
"Want to Come Home"
"Ready When You Ready"
"Didn't You Know"
"Dash Wey the Vial"
"Bald Head Jesus"
"Food"
"Serious Thing"

Personnel
Bunny Wailer	 - 	Percussion, Arranger, Director, Vocals, Producer, Cover Art Concept
The Psalms	 - 	Background vocals
Tony "Asher" Brissett	 - 	Keyboards
Barry Barrington Bailey	 - 	Horn
Headley Bennett	 - 	Horn
Errol Carter	 - 	Bass
Steven "Cat" Coore	 - 	Guitar
Carlton "Santa" Davis	 - 	drums
Sly Dunbar	 - 	Drums
Bobby Ellis	 - 	Horn
Harry T. Powell - Percussion
Eric "Bingy Bunny" Lamont	 - 	Rhythm guitar
Sugar Minott	 - 	Drums
Johnny "Dizzy" Moore	 - 	Horn
Sylvan Morris	 - 	Engineer
Karl Pitterson	 - 	Mixing
Dwight Pinkney	 - 	Guitar
Robbie Shakespeare	 - 	Bass
Earl "Chinna" Smith	 - 	Bass
Keith Sterling	 - 	Keyboards
Daniel "Danny Axeman" Thompson	 - 	Bass
Neville Garrick	 - 	Graphic Design, Art Direction, Cover Art Concept
Owen "Red Fox" Stewart	 - 	Keyboards

References

Bunny Wailer albums
Shanachie Records albums
1989 albums